Associação Atlética Guarany, commonly known as Guarany, is a Brazilian football club based in Porto da Folha, Sergipe state.

History
The club was founded on January 1, 1940. Guarany won the Campeonato Sergipano Série A2 in 1988, and in 2001.

Achievements

 Campeonato Sergipano Série A2:
 Winners (3): 1988, 2001, 2018

Stadium
Associação Atlética Guarany play their home games at Estádio Caio Feitosa. The stadium has a maximum capacity of 3,000 people.

References

Association football clubs established in 1940
Football clubs in Sergipe
1940 establishments in Brazil